Harana is a village in Rajgarh district in the state of Madhya Pradesh in India. It belongs to Bhopal Division.

Geographical
It is located 41 km to the south of District headquarters Rajgarh. 25 km from Sarangpur. 124 km from State capital Bhopal. Nearby villages to Harana include Panda (3 km), Bhatkhedi (7 km), Dhamanda (8 km), Bhumka (9 km), Simrol (10 km). Harana is surrounded by Nalkheda Tehsil to the west, Moman Badodia Tehsil to the south, Khilchipur Tehsil to the north, and Zirapur Tehsil to the east. Nearby cities include Sarangpur, Pachore, Shujalpur, and Shajapur.

This place is in the border of the Rajgarh District and Shajapur District. Shajapur District Moman Badodia is south of this place.

Demographics
 India census, Harana had a population of 2,471. Males constitute 51% of the population and females 49%. Harana has an average literacy rate of 57.79%, lower than the state average of 69.32%: male literacy is 75.66%, and female literacy is 39.52%. In Harana, 12.18% of the population is under 6 years of age.

Religious/Devotional places around Harana

Nearby villages

Schools in Harana

References 

Villages in Rajgarh district